Károly Simonyi (18 October 1916 – 9 October 2001) was a Hungarian physicist and writer. He was professor of electrical engineering at Technical University of Budapest and the author of the popular tabletop book A Cultural History of Physics (A fizika kultúrtörténete, 1978).  

He is the father of Charles Simonyi, a prominent computer-software executive who oversaw the creation of Microsoft Office.

Biography
Simonyi was born the seventh of ten children in a small village in western Hungary. Simonyi earned degrees respectively in engineering at the Technical University of Budapest and in law at the University of Pecs. Following World War II, he taught electrical engineering at the University of Sopron and in 1952 he professed at the Technical University, where he was known as an outstanding teacher and organized the Department of Theoretical Electrical Engineering. 

In the 1960s he lost his professorial post due to the political climate in Hungary.  He then undertook writing the story of the history of physics and the cultural, philosophical, and societal movements that had shaped and been shaped by its development. 
Károly's paternal grandfather was Sándor Simonyi-Semadam, who, as prime minister in the aftermath of World War I, signed the Treaty of Trianon.

References

1916 births
2001 deaths
Hungarian scientists
People from Budapest
Academic staff of the Budapest University of Technology and Economics